Vladimír Veselý (born 8 July 1976) is a Slovak former footballer and current manager of MFK Ružomberok's U19 team.

Coaching career
On 18 October 2019, Veselý was appointed manager of MFK Ružomberok's U19 team.

External links

Futbalnet profile
Eurofotbal profile

References

1976 births
Living people
Slovak footballers
Association football defenders
MŠK Žilina players
FK Dubnica players
AS Trenčín players
SK Dynamo České Budějovice players
FC DAC 1904 Dunajská Streda players
FK Dukla Banská Bystrica players
FK Železiarne Podbrezová players
AS Trenčín managers
Slovak Super Liga players
Expatriate footballers in the Czech Republic
Expatriate footballers in Poland
Sportspeople from Žilina
Slovak football managers